Luis Quiñones may refer to:

 Luis Quiñónez (footballer) (born 1968), Colombian footballer
 Luis Quiñonez (politician), Guatemalan-American war veteran and business executive

See also
 Luis Quiñones (disambiguation)
 José Luis Quiñónez (born 1984), Ecuadorian footballer